Gangchang Park is a park that is located in Daegu Dalseo-gu, South Korea. Another name of Gangchang park is Pasan.
The park has 22 kinds of facilities for residents.
And there is Kumho river to the neighborhood of the park.

References
https://web.archive.org/web/20120330161020/http://www.elifeplus.co.kr/contents/29273.html

Parks in Daegu
Dalseo District